Castro Marim is a town and a municipality in the southern region of Algarve, in Portugal. The population in 2011 was 6,747, in an area of 300.84 km2.

The current Mayor is Francisco Amaral, elected by the Social Democratic Party.

The municipal holiday is June 24.

In the Roman era, Castro Marim was known as Aesuris.

Every year in the end of August there is a Medieval Fair/Festival that reunites many people from across the world to perform, like medieval musicians, archers, swordsmen, dancers, troupes, etc. There are sellers too: blacksmiths, textile crafters (weaving), herbs sellers, etc.

In honour to his Portuguese mother, Lucia Gomes, from Castro Marim, Paco de Lucía - the Spanish composer and guitarist - named his thirteenth studio album Castro Marín.

Parishes
Administratively, the municipality is divided into 4 civil parishes (freguesias):
 Altura
 Azinhal
 Castro Marim
 Odeleite

Notable people 
Domingos Correia Arouca (1790–1861) a general, administrator and colonial governor of Cape Verde, 1835-1837

See also
Fort São Sebastião (Castro Marim)

References

External links

official Castro Marim Municipality website

 
Populated places in Faro District
Municipalities of the Algarve
Towns of the Algarve
Portugal–Spain border crossings
Municipalities of Faro District